This is a list of notable criminally-active street gangs operating or formerly operating in California.

To be included in this list, the gang must have a Wikipedia article with references showing it is a California street gang.

Prison gangs 
 Aryan Brotherhood
 Black Guerrilla Family
 Mexican Mafia
 Nuestra Familia
 Fresno Bulldogs

Street gangs 

18th Street gang
Abergil crime family
Armenian Power
Bahala Na Gang
Bloods
Black P. Stones
Bounty Hunter Bloods
Pirus
Chosen Few MC
Crips
Asian Boyz
Grape Street Watts Crips
Rollin' 30s Harlem Crips
Rollin 60's Neighborhood Crips
Sons of Samoa
Tongan Crip Gang
Venice Shoreline Crips
Devils Diciples
Diablos Motorcycle Club
Fresno Bulldogs
Galloping Goose Motorcycle Club
Gypsy Joker Motorcycle Club
Hells Angels
Latin Kings (gang)
Los Angeles crime family
Menace of Destruction
Mongols Motorcycle Club
Moonshiners Motorcycle Club
MS-13
Norteños
Peckerwood
Nazi Lowriders
Public Enemy No. 1
Satanas
Sinaloa Cartel
Beltrán-Leyva Cartel
Sureños
38th Street gang
The Avenues
Azusa 13
Culver City Boys 13
El Monte Flores 
Florencia 13
Logan Heights Gang
OVS
Playboys
Puente 13
Santa Monica 13
Río 13
Shelltown 38th St
Temple Street
Toonerville Rifa 13
Varrio Nuevo Estrada
Venice 13
Westside Locos 13
White Fence
Vineland Boys
Tiny Rascal Gang
Triad
14K Triad
Bamboo Union
Big Circle Gang
Black Dragons
Four Seas Gang
Jackson Street Boys
Wah Ching
Wo Hop To
Wo Shing Wo
Vagos Motorcycle Club
Yakuza

See also

 List of gangs in Los Angeles, California
 List of gangs in the United States

External links

Street gangs
Organizations based in California
Lists of gangs
United States law-related lists
Lists of organizations based in the United States
Street Gangs
Gangs, California